Kaure may refer to:

 Kaure language, a Papuan language
 Kaure, Gurdaspur, a village in Punjab, India
 Kaure, a village in Ngamiland East, Botswana

See also 
 Kauri (disambiguation)
 Koure (disambiguation)